Volokonovka is a town in Belgorod Oblast, Russia. It is the administrative center of Volokonovsky District. Population:

Geography

History
The settlement was founded in 1731.  According to the 1877 census, there were 6,240 residents in the town. Status of urban-type settlements was granted since 1961.

On June 25, 2011 a monument to Grigory Volkonsky was unveiled.

References

Cities and towns in Belgorod Oblast
Populated places in Volokonovsky District
Biryuchensky Uyezd